Oxyphyllum is a genus of South American flowering plants in the family Asteraceae.

Species
The only known species is Oxyphyllum ulicinum, native to northern Chile.

References

Nassauvieae
Monotypic Asteraceae genera
Endemic flora of Chile